The Rolland-Veillet Park is a public park located at the intersection of Bussières and Mercedès-Bourgeois streets, in the western part of the town of Val-d'Or, in the Regional County Municipality of La Vallée-de-l'Or Regional County Municipality, in the administrative region of Abitibi-Témiscamingue, in Quebec, in Canada.

This municipal park is intended for recreational activities.

Toponymy 

Arrived in Val-d'Or in 1936, Roland Veillet (1918–2001), electrician entrepreneur, founded, with Paul Gosselin, the company Veillet and Gosselin. Roland Veillet was the warden of the parish of Saint-Sauveur (Val-d'Or), from 1939 to 1946, president of the Club Richelieu, and commissioner and president of the Val-d'Or Regional School Board. The toponym "Parc Roland-Veillet" was formalized on April 26, 2011 at the Commission de toponymie du Québec..

References

See also 

 Val-d'Or

Parks in Quebec
Val-d'Or